Andrey Nikolayevich Kobelev (born 22 October 1968 in Moscow) is a Russian retired footballer who played as a midfielder and a current manager.

Playing career
During his career Kobelev played for FC Dynamo Moscow (three spells, more than 250 Russian Premier League appearances and nearly 50 goals), Real Betis and FC Zenit St. Petersburg, retiring at 34. With the Spanish side, he played in two Segunda División seasons, and was still in roster for the 1994–95 campaign, but failed to compete in La Liga.

Kobelev was capped for Russia once. Additionally, he helped win the 1985 UEFA European Under-16 Football Championship and the 1990 Under-21 European Championship.

Coaching career
In 2006, Kobelev took up coaching, starting with his first team Dynamo Moscow following the sacking of Yuri Semin due to poor results. On 27 April 2010 he was fired himself, being replaced by Miodrag Božović.

In June 2011, Kobelev was appointed at FC Krylia Sovetov Samara. In November of the following year, following a poor start to the season, he resigned and left his place to caretaker Aleksandr Tsygankov.

He returned to Dynamo in 2015, first as director of sports and then as a manager. Due to a string of poor results, he left the club on 10 May 2016.

References

External links
 
 
 Betisweb stats and bio 

1968 births
Living people
Footballers from Moscow
Soviet footballers
Russian footballers
Association football midfielders
Soviet Top League players
Russian Premier League players
FC Dynamo Moscow players
FC Zenit Saint Petersburg players
Segunda División players
Real Betis players
Russia international footballers
Russian expatriate footballers
Expatriate footballers in Spain
Russian expatriate sportspeople in Spain
Russian football managers
Russian Premier League managers
FC Dynamo Moscow managers
PFC Krylia Sovetov Samara managers
Soviet Union under-21 international footballers